Karl Schlegel may refer to:

 Karl Wilhelm Friedrich Schlegel (1772–1829), German poet, critic and scholar
 Karl Schlegel (aviator) (1893–1918), German World War I flying ace